Mary Parsons, Countess of Rosse (14 April 1813 – 1885), was an Anglo-Irish amateur astronomer, architect, furniture designer, and pioneering photographer. Often known simply as Mary Rosse, she was one of the early practitioners of making photographs from waxed-paper negatives.

Early life 
Mary Field was born on 14 April 1813, at Heaton Hall, Heaton, Bradford, Yorkshire, the daughter of John Wilmer Field, a wealthy estate owner. She had a sister, Delia, and they were educated at home by Susan Lawson, a governess who encouraged the young Mary's creativity and broad interests, including astronomy. The sister were joint heirs to their father's fortune.

Through her family she met the future 3rd Earl of Rosse, then Lord Oxmantown (1800–1867), an Anglo-Irish astronomer and naturalist, and they were married on 14 April 1836. In February 1841, Lord Oxmantown succeeded his father in the family peerage to become The 3rd Earl of Rosse. They had married on 14 April 1836, her 23rd birthday. Mary, Baroness Oxmantown, thus now became The Countess of Rosse.

Astronomy 
In the early 1840s the couple became interested in astronomy, and Mary Rosse helped her husband, Lord Rosse, build a number of giant telescopes, including the so-called Leviathan Telescope, that was considered a technical marvel in its time. The author, Henrietta Heald, contends that Rosse was not only a financial support to the building of the telescope, but that she also was involved in a practical and intellectual capacity. The Leviathan of Parsontown was completed in 1845 and held the record as the world's largest telescope for over 70 years, and was mentioned in Jules Verne’s science fiction novel, From the Earth to the Moon.

She was an accomplished blacksmith – which was very unusual for higher class women of this time – and some of the iron work that supported the telescope may have been constructed by her. Other metal cast items around the castle grounds were designed by her, including bronze gates.

During the Great Famine of 1845–47 in Ireland she was responsible for keeping over five hundred men employed in work in and around Birr Castle, where she and her husband lived.

She created a huge dining room at Birr Castle in which to entertain scientific guests, which became increasingly used when Lord Rosse became President of the Royal Society of London in 1848. Guests included mathematician William Hamilton, who wrote her a sonnet about his experience of gazing through the Leviathan.

Photography 
In 1842, Lord Rosse began experimenting in daguerreotype photography, possibly learning some of the art from his acquaintance William Henry Fox Talbot. In 1854, Lord Rosse wrote to Fox Talbot saying that Lady Rosse too had just commenced photography, and sent some examples of her work. Fox Talbot replied that some of her photographs of the telescope "are all that can be desired".

Lady Rosse became a member of the Dublin Photographic Society, and in 1859 she received a silver medal for "best paper negative" from the Photographic Society of Ireland. Many examples of her photography are in the Birr Castle Archives. Much of the topography of Birr Castle that she portrayed has changed very little, and it is possible to compare many of her photographs with the actual places. She recorded the Leviathan in her photographs including one image showing her three sons, Clere, Randal, Charles and her sister in law, Jane Knox, standing upright at the mouth of the telescope.

Children 
The Countess of Rosse gave birth to eleven children, but only four survived until adulthood:

 Lawrence Parsons, 4th Earl of Rosse (17 November 1840 – 30 August 1908)
 Reverend Randal Parsons (26 April 1848 – 15 November 1936)
 Hon. Richard Clere Parsons (21 February 1851 – 26 January 1923), apparently made a name for himself building railways in South America.
 Sir Charles Algernon Parsons (13 June 1854 – 11 February 1931), known for his commercial development of the steam turbine. His wife, Lady Katharine Parsons and their daughter Rachel Parsons were founders of the Women's Engineering Society and its first and second presidents.

Death 
Mary, Dowager Countess of Rosse, died in 1885.

Notes

Further reading 
Taylor, Roger. Impressed by Light: British Photographs from Paper Negatives, 1840–1860. New York: Metropolitan Museum of Art, 2007. .

External links 

 Birr Castle Demesne, Voyage of Discovery
 Great Irish Women, Part 4: Mary Field Rosse

Pioneers of photography
1813 births
1885 deaths
Scientists from Yorkshire
Irish astronomers
19th-century English photographers
Irish countesses
English women photographers
19th-century British women artists
British blacksmiths
Photographers from Yorkshire
19th-century women photographers
Wives of knights